Magathane Vidhan Sabha Constituency is one of the 288 Vidhan Sabha (Legislative Assembly) constituencies of Maharashtra state in western India.

Overview
Magathane constituency is one of the 26 Vidhan Sabha constituencies located in the Mumbai Suburban district.

Magathane is part of the Mumbai North Lok Sabha constituency along with five other Vidhan Sabha segments, namely Dahisar, Borivali, Kandivali East, Charkop, and Malad West in the Mumbai Suburban district.

Members of Legislative Assembly

Election results

2019 result

2014 result

2009

See also
 Magathane
 List of constituencies of Maharashtra Vidhan Sabha

References

Assembly constituencies of Mumbai
Politics of Mumbai Suburban district
Borivali
Assembly constituencies of Maharashtra